Isidore Weiss (1867 – June 12, 1936) was a Frenchman who won seven world championships for international draughts from 1899 to 1911, a record not surpassed until Alexei Chizhov 85 years later.

In international draughts, the Coup Weiss is a refinement of the Coup de l'Expresse named after him.

References

External links
History of checkers site
Information on the "Coup Weiss"

1867 births
French draughts players
Players of international draughts
1936 deaths